Kyree is a given name. Notable people with the name include:

Kyree King (born 1994), American sprinter
Kyree Walker (born 2000), American basketball player

See also
Kyrie (given name)

Masculine given names